Daniel Joseph O'Donovan (31 January 1926 – 28 May 1999) was an Irish Gaelic football manager and player. He played football with his local club St. Nicholas' and was a member of the Cork senior inter-county team from 1948 until 1955.  O'Donovan managed Cork to the All-Ireland title in 1973.

Biography
Born Daniel Joseph O'Donovan at 150 Old Youghal Road, Dillon's Cross, Cork into a family with strong sporting and Irish republican background. He was a nephew of Cork IRA officer Dan "Sandow" O'Donovan.  He followed in the footsteps of his father and grandfather and became a carpenter by trade. He married Cork camogie player Sheila Cahill in the 1950s and they had three sons.  The eldest, Diarmuid O'Donovan is Assistant CEO of the Evening Echo and a sports columnist with that newspaper.

Honours

Player

St. Nicholas
Munster Senior Club Football Championship: 1966
Cork Senior Football Championship: 1954, 1965, 1966

Glen Rovers
Cork Senior Hurling Championship: 1944, 1948, 1949, 1950, 1953, 1954

Cork
Munster Senior Football Championship: 1949, 1952
National Football League: 1951-52

Munster
Railway Cup: 1949

Management

Glen Rovers
Cork Senior Hurling Championship: 1989

St. Nicholas
Munster Senior Club Football Championship: 1966
Cork Senior Football Championship: 1965, 1966

Cork
All-Ireland Senior Football Championship: 1973
Munster Senior Football Championship: 1966, 1967, 1973, 1974

Munster
Railway Cup: 1972

References

1926 births
1999 deaths
Cork inter-county Gaelic footballers
Dual players
Gaelic football goalkeepers
Gaelic football managers
Glen Rovers hurlers
Munster inter-provincial Gaelic footballers
St Nicholas' Gaelic footballers